Prosper is an unincorporated community in Coos County, Oregon, United States. There is no longer a town at the site.

The first cannery on the Coquille River was started in about 1882 by D. H. Getchell in what came to be known as Prosper. Prosper was founded in the summer of 1892 by Adam Pershbaker, who built a sawmill and a shipyard there. The Emil Heuckendorff shipyard was established soon after. Prosper had a post office from 1893 until 1928; Pershbaker was the first postmaster. The name was likely chosen in the hope the locality would be prosperous. In 1915, Prosper's population was 500, and it had two salmon canneries, and two shingle and saw mills. Passenger boats traveled three times a day to Bandon and Coquille.

See also
Steamboats of the Coquille River

References

Unincorporated communities in Coos County, Oregon
Ghost towns in Oregon
1892 establishments in Oregon
Populated places established in 1892
Unincorporated communities in Oregon